The Warwickshire Coalfield extends between Warwick and Tamworth in the English Midlands. Its western margin is defined by the 'Western Boundary Fault'. In the northeast it abuts against steeply dipping shales of Cambrian age. The larger part of the outcrop at the surface consists of the Warwickshire Group of largely coal-barren red beds. Until its closure in 2013, the Daw Mill mine near Arley within the coalfield, was Britain's biggest coal-producer in the 21st century.

Principal seams
The principal coal seams within the productive Lower and Middle Coal Measures include (in stratigraphic order i.e. youngest/uppermost first):

Middle Coal Measures
 Half Yard
 Four Feet
 Thin Rider
 Two Yard
 Bare
 Ryder
 Ell
 Nine Feet
 High Main
 Smithy (Low Main)

Lower Coal Measures
 Thin
 Seven Feet
 Trencher
 Yard
 Deep Rider
 Double
 Upper Bench (or Top Bench)
 Bench Thin
 Lower Bench
 Stumpy
 Stanhope

The Two Yard, Thin Rider, Ryder, Ell, Nine Feet, and High Main merge as one massive bed of coal known as the Thick Coal in parts of the coalfield.

Collieries
Collieries mining in the Warwickshire Coalfield were:

Alexandra Colliery
Alvecote Colliery
Amington Colliery
Ansley Hall Colliery
Arley Colliery
Baddesley Colliery, closed 1989
Binley Colliery
Birch Coppice Colliery, closed 1989
Coventry Colliery, also known as Keresley Colliery, closed 1991
Craven Colliery
Daw Mill Colliery
Dexter Colliery
Exhall Colliery
Griff No 4 Colliery
Griff Clara Colliery
Haunchwood Colliery
Hawkesbury Colliery
Kingsbury Colliery
Newdigate Colliery, closed in 1982
North Warwickshire Colliery (formerly Pooley)
Stockingford Colliery
Wyken Colliery

See also
 Warwickshire Miners' Association charity

References

Sources

 
Coal mining regions in England
Geology of Warwickshire
Geography of Warwickshire
Carboniferous England